Nikos Ganos (born 22 July 1983), also known as Nicko, is a Greek singer and model.

Career
In 2004, Ganos participated in the first and only series of Super Idol, the former Greek version of the British talent show hit Pop Idol. He was in the "Bottom 2 or 3" from weeks 4 to 7 and was eliminated in third place on week 8, the last week before the final. Since then Ganos has continued to release singles that have become hits in Greece and has worked with some of the biggest names of the Greek music scene like Giannis Parios, Kaiti Garbi, Giorgos Mazonakis and Marinella. In 2010 he released the song "Last Summer" which was the most successful song in Greece that year. In 2011 he performed "Last Summer" live on X Factor Greece. In 2012, he performed "Break Me in the Dark" (a remix of "Break Me"') with Katerina Stikoudi at the MAD Video Music Awards. In 2013 he released his new song "I'm in love". In April 2013, Ganos competed in the first Greek series of Your Face Sounds Familiar and was eliminated in week 12. Each week he disguised as and performed song by famous singers like George Michael, Justin Timberlake, John Lennon, Notis Sfakianakis, Justin Bieber, Giorgos Mazonakis, Prince, Zozo Sapountzaki, and winner of the Eurovision Song Contest 2003, Sertab Erener. Ganos himself has shown interest in representing Greece at the Eurovision Song Contest in the past.

Personal life
Nikos Ganos was born and lives in Athens, Greece. He has toured around Greece. He has two tattoos, one of an ancient Greek soldier's helmet on his back and "family tree" written in Hindi on his left arm.

Discography

Singles
 "Koita ti ekanes (EP including 5 songs)" (2010)
 "Efyga" (2010)
 "Last Summer" (2010)
 "Last Summer (EP including 6 remixes)" (2010)
 "Break Me" (2011)
 "This Love is Killing Me" (2011)
 "Say My Name" (2012)
 "I'm in Love" (2012)
 "Time After Time" (2013)
 "Nea mera" (feat. OGE) (2013)
 "Monos" (2014)
 "Walking alone" (2014)
 "Hameni Atlantida (feat. James Sky)"  (2014)
 "Sta vathia" (2015)
 "Ti na leme" (2016)

References

External links
Official Facebook site

Living people
21st-century Greek male singers
Singers from Athens
1985 births